Wang Bowen (born 25 July 2003) is a Chinese professional footballer who plays as a forward for Werder Bremen II.

Club career
Born in Xuchang, Henan, Wang started his career at Nantong Haimen Codion, joining in 2011. In 2018, at the age of fifteen, he travelled to Germany to join local side SC Borgfeld. Having also represented Oberneuland at youth level, he joined Brinkumer in 2021.

In June 2022, following impressive performances with Brinkumer, Wang joined Werder Bremen, being assigned to their reserve team.

International career
Wang has represented China at various youth levels internationally. In August 2022, he was called up to the under-19 side for the first time.

Career statistics

Club
.

References

2003 births
Living people
Chinese footballers
China youth international footballers
Association football forwards
Regionalliga players
FC Oberneuland players
SV Werder Bremen players
SV Werder Bremen II players
Chinese expatriate footballers
Chinese expatriate sportspeople in Germany
Expatriate footballers in Germany